Sulciolus perspicua is a moth in the family Lecithoceridae. It was described by Alexey Diakonoff in 1954. It is found in New Guinea.

References

Moths described in 1954
Sulciolus